Antonín Janda-Očko (21 September 1892 – 21 January 1960) was a former international Czechoslovak footballer who played for Czechoslovakia and Sparta Prague as a forward.

International career
Janda played 10 times for his home country, and in his participation with the Czechoslovak Olympic team at the 1920 Summer Olympics football tournament he was notable for having scored two hat-tricks and appearing in the final. However, he did not win a medal; after the dismissal of his team-mate Karel Steiner in that final against Belgium, Janda and the other discontented Czechoslovakians left the pitch in the 40th minute, ultimately causing the Czechoslovaks to get disqualified.

References

External links

 

1892 births
1960 deaths
Czechoslovak footballers
Czechoslovakia international footballers
Olympic footballers of Czechoslovakia
Footballers at the 1920 Summer Olympics
AC Sparta Prague players
Association football forwards
Footballers from Prague
Czech footballers